Hoffman (also known as Hoffman Station) is an unincorporated community located within Monroe Township in Middlesex County, New Jersey, United States. The settlement is located at the site of a former railroad station on the Freehold and Jamesburg Agricultural Railroad. Today, most of the area is made up of homes and housing developments along Hoffman Station Road (County Route 614) and Gravel Hill-Spotswood Road. Forestland and the Manalapan Brook valley make up the remainder of the area.

References

Monroe Township, Middlesex County, New Jersey
Unincorporated communities in Middlesex County, New Jersey
Unincorporated communities in New Jersey